is a co-educational private university in Hamamatsu city, Shizuoka Prefecture Japan.

History
Seirei Christopher University began as the “Bethel Home”, a private tuberculosis sanatorium established in 1932 by local Japanese Christians in Hamamatsu. From the beginning, the sanatorium faced difficulties with finances and hostility from its neighbors due to prejudices against tuberculosis sufferers and followers of Christianity. Although the sanatorium raised funds to acquire land outside of the city by 1937, it continued to experience problems due to the increasingly totalitarian attitude of the pre-war Japanese government. An unexpected donation on Christmas Day, 1939, directly from Emperor Hirohito, resolved both its financial issues and problems with the local government.

In the immediate postwar period, the sanatorium expanded into education by forming the “Enshū School of Christ”, the forerunner of both "Seirei Christopher High School" and "Seirei Christopher University" in 1949. Seeing the need for increased medical services in postwar Japan, the sanatorium created the "Seirei Vocational School for Practical Nurses" in 1952; it changed its name in 1969 to the "Seirei Gakuen Junior College of Nursing". In 1992, with the financial help of three billion yen from the Tokio Marine & Nichido Fire Insurance Company, a four-year "Seirei Christopher College of Nursing" was founded.

Seirei Christopher College of Nursing changed its name to "Seirei Christopher College" when the School of Social Work was established in 2002. The School of Social Work started a graduate studies programs in April 2004.  Also in 2004, the School of Rehabilitation Sciences was founded.

Academic Programmes
 School of Nursing
Department of Nursing
Department of Nursing
Department of Public Health
Department of Midwifery
Graduate Programs of Nursing
School of Rehabilitation Sciences
Department of Rehabilitation Sciences
Division of Physical Therapy
Division of Occupational Therapy
Division of Speech Therapy
Graduate Programs of Rehabilitation Sciences
School of Social Work
Department of Social Work
Division of Care Work
Division of Social Work
Graduate Programs of Social Work

External links
 Official website
Japan Student Services Organization

Educational institutions established in 1992
Christian universities and colleges in Japan
Private universities and colleges in Japan
Universities and colleges in Shizuoka Prefecture
Buildings and structures in Hamamatsu
Tokio Marine
1992 establishments in Japan